Walter Gillik (born 29 July 1938) is a German bobsledder. He competed in the four man event at the 1972 Winter Olympics.

References

1938 births
Living people
German male bobsledders
Olympic bobsledders of West Germany
Bobsledders at the 1972 Winter Olympics
Sportspeople from Opava